The Akron Zips men's soccer team is an intercollegiate varsity sports team of the University of Akron. The team is a member of the National Collegiate Athletic Association Division I Mid-American Conference through the 2022 season, after which it will join the Big East Conference as a single-sport member. Akron is regularly ranked in the Top 10 NSCAA collegiate men's soccer poll. They have been ranked No. 1 previously in 2005, 2009, 2010, and 2016.  The Zips have played their home games at FirstEnergy Stadium-Cub Cadet Field, formerly named Lee R. Jackson Soccer Field and Cub Cadet Field, since 1966. They won their first national championship in 2010.

History
In 1954, an Oberlin College transfer named Stu Parry started the soccer team at Akron.  That year, they finished the season with two wins and one tie.  The next year, men's soccer was officially offered by the university and after starting the season with two losses, they ended with a 2–4–1 record, with the team's first win coming against rival Kent State.

Parry eventually led the team to nine Ohio College Soccer Association titles as well as six NCAA playoff appearances. In 1986, the men's soccer team gained the most exposure in the NCAA tournament, finishing second to Duke by a score of 1–0.  A Duke player, Ken Lolla, took over the program in 1993 and then became Akron's all-time winningest coach, with a record of 160–68–25.  He also led the team to their first No. 1 ranking, which was also the first ever MAC team in any sport to be ranked No. 1.

In 2006, Caleb Porter became head coach, leading the team to first-place finishes in the conference every year from 2007 to 2012, an appearance in the final of the national championship (the College Cup) in 2009, and a national championship in 2010.

Jared Embick succeeded Porter as head coach after the 2012 season. The team has finished first in the conference every year since, and reached the national semi-final in 2015.

After the 2022 season, the MAC, whose men's soccer league had been decimated by conference realignment earlier in the decade, dropped that sport. Akron moved men's soccer to the Big East Conference, making it the only one of the four full MAC members with men's soccer teams that did not move that sport to the Missouri Valley Conference.

Colors and badge
The team uses the school colors of blue and gold.

Stadium
Lee Jackson Field was dedicated on October 22, 1966.  Along with the soccer venue, the  complex also includes fields for the school's baseball, softball, and track and field competition areas along with a practice field for the football team.  The fields are located towards the southeast corner of the University of Akron campus, just west of InfoCision Stadium.

Other expansions and upgrades for the stadium have included a grandstand with seating capacity of 2,200, berm seating around the stadium with a capacity of 2,600, and lighting which meets national television specifications.

Announced in March 2011 was a partnership between The University of Akron and Cub Cadet, the premier brand of Cleveland-based MTD Products, which will rename the Zips' new, state-of-the-art grass soccer field Cub Cadet Field.

In June 2011, the field was renamed FirstEnergy Stadium-Cub Cadet field after Cub Cadet as well as First Energy plans were announced to build 300 new bleacher seats, permanent restrooms, and a concession stand along with the renaming.

Supporters
The AK-ROWDIES are a student organization which cheer on sports teams in various sports at the university.  The ROWDIES were formed as an official student organization in 2005.  During the soccer games, they can be found behind the goal area, heckling the opponent's goalie.

Notable alumni

  Niko De Vera (2014-2017) - Currently with Portland Timbers
  Conrad Earnest
  George Nanchoff (1973–1976) – Retired
  Louis Nanchoff (1974–1977) – Retired
  Benny Dargle (1975–1977) – Retired
  Shaun Pendleton (1982–1985) – Retired
  Roderick Scott (1985–88) – Retired
  Cameron Knowles (2001–04) – Retired
  Devon McKenney (2003–2007)
  Siniša Ubiparipović (2004–2006) – Retired
  Evan Bush (2005–2008) – Currently with Columbus Crew
  Justin Sadler (2005)
  Ben Zemanski (2006–2009) 
  Steve Zakuani (2006–2007) – Retired
  Chris Korb (2007–2010) 
  Michael Nanchoff (2007–2010) – Retired
  Blair Gavin (2007–2009) – Retired
  Teal Bunbury (2008–2009) – Currently with Nashville SC
  Darlington Nagbe (2008–2010) – Currently with Columbus Crew
  Anthony Ampaipitakwong (2007–2010) – Currently with Bangkok United
  Kofi Sarkodie (2008–2010) 
  Zarek Valentin (2009–2010)- Currently with the Houston Dynamo
  Scott Caldwell (2009–2012) – Currently with the Real Salt Lake
  Chad Barson (2009–2012) – Retired 
  Darren Mattocks (2010–2011) – Currently with FC Cincinnati
  Perry Kitchen (2010) – Currently with LA Galaxy
  DeAndre Yedlin (2011–2012) – Currently with Inter Miami CF
  Aodhan Quinn (2011–2013) – Currently with Phoenix Rising
  Wil Trapp (2011–2012) – Currently with Minnesota United FC
  Dillon Serna (2012) – Currently with the Colorado Rapids
  Saad Abdul-Salaam (2012–2014) – Currently with Seattle Sounders
  Richie Laryea (2014–2015) – Currently with Toronto FC
  Adam Najem (2013–2016) – Currently with Memphis 901
  Jonathan Lewis (2016) – Currently with Colorado Rapids
  João Moutinho (2018) - 2018 MLS Superdraft First-Overall Draft Pick for Los Angeles FC

Previous head coaches
Listed according to when they became head coach for Akron (year in parentheses):

 1950s–1960s: Stu Parry (1955)
 1970s–1980s: Bill Killen (1970), Robert Dowdy (1974), Steve Parker (1982)
 1990s–2000s (decade): Ken Lolla (1993), Caleb Porter (2006)

Achievements
 NCAA Men's Division I Soccer Championship:
 Winners (1): 2010
 Runners-up (3): 1986, 2009, 2018
 Mid-American Conference Tournament:
 Winners (15): 1998, 2002, 2004, 2005, 2007, 2008, 2009, 2010, 2012, 2013, 2014, 2015, 2016, 2017, 2018
 Runners-up (4): 1995, 1997, 2001, 2006
 Mid-American Conference Regular Season:
 Winners (17): 1993, 1995, 1997, 1998, 1999, 2000, 2002, 2005, 2006, 2007, 2008, 2009, 2010, 2011, 2012, 2013, 2014, 2015, 2016
 Runners-up (5): 1994, 1996, 2001, 2003, 2004
 Ohio College Soccer Association:
 Winners (19): 1958, 1959, 1960, 1961, 1963, 1964, 1966, 1967, 1968, 1971, 1975, 1976, 1980, 1981, 1982, 1983, 1984, 1986, 1987
 Mid-Continent Conference Regular Season:
 Winners (1): 1991

Records
 Most Goals in a game: 14 (12–2) vs. Cleveland State, September 9, 2005
 Most Goals in a half: 8 vs. Green Bay, 1986
 Lee Jackson Field attendance: 4,744 vs. Tulsa, September 22, 2010
 FirstEnergy Stadium–Cub Cadet Field attendance: 5,819 vs. Ohio State, September 28, 2011

See also
 Akron Zips football
 Akron Zips men's basketball
 Collegiate soccer
 2010 Akron Zips men's soccer team

References

External links

 

 
Akron Zips
Soccer clubs in Ohio
1954 establishments in Ohio
Association football clubs established in 1954